The Central Committee of the 6th Conference of the Russian Social Democratic Labour Party (Bolsheviks) was in session from 17 January 1912 until 3 August 1917.

Plenums
The Central Committee was not a permanent institution. It convened plenary sessions and meetings. One CC plenary session, fifteen meetings and one CC conference were held between the 6th Conference and the 7th Conference. When the CC was not in session, decision-making power was vested in the internal bodies of the CC itself; that is, the Politburo, Secretariat and Orgburo. None of these bodies were permanent either; typically they convened several times a month.

Composition

Members

Candidates

References

Citations

Bibliography
 

Central Committee of the Communist Party of the Soviet Union
Russian Social Democratic Labour Party members
1912 establishments in the Russian Empire
1917 disestablishments in Russia